The following is a list of the municipalities (comuni) of Apulia, Italy.

There are 258 municipalities in Apulia (as of January 2019):

41 in the Metropolitan City of Bari
10 in the Province of Barletta-Andria-Trani
20 in the Province of Brindisi
61 in the Province of Foggia
97 in the Province of Lecce
29 in the Province of Taranto

List

References

 
Geography of Apulia
Apulia